The Knights of the Golden Circle (KGC) was a secret society founded in 1854 by American George W. L. Bickley, the objective of which was to create a new country, known as the Golden Circle, where slavery would be legal.

Originally, the KGC advocated that the new territories should be annexed by the United States, in order to vastly increase the number of slave states and thus the power of the slave-holding Southern upper classes. In response to the increased anti-slavery agitation that followed the Dred Scott decision (1857), the Knights changed their position: the Southern United States should secede, forming their own confederation, and then invade and annex the area of the Golden Circle to vastly expand the power of the South. The new country's northern border would roughly coincide with the Mason–Dixon line, and within it were included such cities as Washington, D.C., St. Louis, Mexico City, and Panama City.

The KGC's proposal grew out of previous unsuccessful proposals to annex Cuba (Ostend Manifesto), parts of Central America (Filibuster War), and all of Mexico (All of Mexico Movement). In Cuba, the issue was complicated by the desire of many in the colony for independence from Spain. Mexico and Central America had no interest in being part of the United States.

As abolitionism in the United States grew in opposition to slavery, the KGC members proposed a separate confederation of slave states, with U.S. states south of the Mason-Dixon line to secede and to align with other slave states to be formed from the "golden circle". In either case, the goal was to increase the power of the Southern slave-holding upper class to such a degree that it could never be dislodged.

During the American Civil War, some Southern sympathizers in the Union or Northern states, such as Ohio, Illinois, Indiana, and Iowa, were accused of belonging to the Knights of the Golden Circle, and in some cases, such as that of Lambdin P. Milligan, they were imprisoned for their activities.

Although nominally a secret society, the existence of the Knights of the Golden Circle was not, in fact, a secret.

Background
European colonialism and dependence on slavery had declined more rapidly in some countries than others. The Spanish possessions of Cuba and Puerto Rico and the Empire of Brazil continued to depend on slavery, as did the Southern United States. In the years prior to the American Civil War, the rise of support for abolition of slavery was one of several divisive issues in the United States.  The slave population there had continued to grow due to natural increase even after the ban on international trade. It was concentrated in the Deep South, on large plantations devoted to the commodity crops of cotton and sugar cane, but it was the basis of agricultural and other labor throughout the southern states.

Early history
George W. L. Bickley, a doctor, editor, and adventurer who lived in Cincinnati, founded the association, organizing the first castle, or local branch, in Cincinnati in 1854.  Membership increased slowly until 1859 and reached its height in 1860. The membership, scattered from New York to California and into Latin America, was never large. Records of the KGC convention held in 1860 state that the organization "originated at Lexington, Kentucky, on the fourth day of July 1854, by five gentlemen who came together on a call made by Gen. George Bickley". Some Knights of the Golden Circle active in northern states, such as Illinois, were accused of anti-Union activities after the Civil War began in 1861.

Hounded by creditors, Bickley left Cincinnati in the late 1850s and traveled through the East and South, promoting an armed expedition to Mexico. The group's original goal was to provide a force to colonize the northern part of Mexico and the West Indies. This would extend pro-slavery interests.  In August 1861, The New York Times described the order as a successor to the Order of the Lone Star, which had been organized for the purpose of conquering Cuba and Nicaragua, succeeding in the latter cause in 1856 under William Walker before being driven out by a coalition of neighboring states.  At that time, the order's prime objective was said to be to raise an army of 16,000 men to conquer and "Southernize" Mexico, which meant making slavery, not legal in Mexico, again legal, while supporting the "Knights of the Columbian Star"—those in the KGC's highest level of membership—for public office.

Plans to seize Lincoln and inaugurate Breckinridge as president
Several members of President James Buchanan's administration were members of the order, as well as Virginia's secessionist Senator James M. Mason. The Secretary of War, John Floyd and of Treasury, Howell Cobb, were members of the circle, in addition to Vice President John Breckenridge. Floyd received instructions from the Order to "seize Navy-yards, Forts, etc. while KGC members were still Cabinet officers and Senators".  The plan was to prevent Lincoln from reaching Washington by capturing him in Baltimore. Then they would occupy the District of Columbia and install Breckinridge as president instead of Lincoln. Floyd used his position as Secretary of War to move munitions and men to the South towards the end of Buchanan's presidency.  His plot was discovered and led to greater distrust of secret societies and Copperheads in general. This distrust was the result of a confirmed plot to overthrow the federal government, rather than general discontent.

Robert Barnwell Rhett, who has been called "the father of secession", said a few days after Lincoln's election:

Civil War

Southwest
In 1859, future Confederate States Army brigadier general Elkanah Greer established KGC castles in East Texas and Louisiana. Although a Unionist, United States Senator Sam Houston introduced a resolution in the U.S. Senate in 1858 for the "United States to declare and maintain an efficient protectorate over the States of Mexico, Nicaragua, Costa Rica, Guatemala, Honduras, and San Salvador." This measure, which supported the goal of the KGC, failed to be adopted. In the spring of 1860, Elkanah Greer had become general and grand commander of 4,000 Military Knights in the KGC's Texas division of 21 castles. The Texas KGC supported President of the United States James Buchanan's policy of, and draft treaty for, protecting routes for U.S commerce across Mexico, which also failed to be approved by the U.S. Senate.

With the election of Abraham Lincoln as President of the United States, the Texas KGC changed its emphasis from a plan to expand U.S. territory into Mexico in order to focus its efforts on providing support for the Southern States' secession from the Union. On February 15, 1861, Ben McCulloch, United States Marshal and former Texas Ranger, began marching toward the Federal arsenal at San Antonio, Texas, with a cavalry force of about 550 men, about 150 of whom were Knights of the Golden Circle (KGC) from six castles. As volunteers continued to join McCulloch the following day, United States Army Brevet Maj. Gen. David E. Twiggs surrendered the arsenal peacefully to the secessionists. Twiggs was appointed a major general in the Confederate States Army on May 22, 1861.

KGC members also figured prominently among those who, in 1861, joined Lt. Col. John Robert Baylor in his temporarily successful takeover of southern New Mexico Territory. In May 1861, members of the KGC and the Confederate Rangers attacked a building which housed a pro-Union newspaper, the Alamo Express, owned by J. P. Newcomb, and burned it down. Other KGC members followed Brig. Gen. Henry Hopkins Sibley on the 1862 New Mexico Campaign, which sought to bring the New Mexico Territory into the Confederate fold. Both Baylor and Trevanion Teel, Sibley's captain of artillery, had been among the KGC members who rode with Ben McCulloch.

North
In early 1862, Radical Republicans in the Senate, aided by Secretary of State William H. Seward, suggested that former president Franklin Pierce, who was greatly critical of the Lincoln administration's war policies, was an active member of the Knights of the Golden Circle. In an angry letter to Seward, Pierce denied that he knew anything about the KGC and demanded that his letter be made public. California Senator Milton Latham subsequently did so when he entered the entire PierceSeward correspondence into the Congressional Globe.

Appealing to the Confederacy's friends in both the North and the border states, the Order spread to Kentucky, as well as the southern parts of such Union states as Indiana, Ohio, Illinois, and Missouri. It became strongest among Copperheads, who were Democrats who wanted to end the Civil War via settlement with the South. Some supported slavery and others were worried about the power of the federal government. In the summer of 1863, Congress authorized a military draft, which the administration soon put into operation. Leaders of the Democratic Party opposed to Abraham Lincoln's administration denounced the draft and other wartime measures, such as the arrest of seditious persons and the president's temporary suspension of the writ of habeas corpus.

During the 1863 Gettysburg Campaign, scam artists in south-central Pennsylvania sold Pennsylvania Dutch farmers $1 paper tickets purported to be from the Knights of the Golden Circle. Along with a series of secret hand gestures, these tickets were supposed to protect the horses and other possessions of ticket holders from seizure by invading Confederate soldiers.  When Confederate Maj. Gen. Jubal Early's infantry division passed through York County, Pennsylvania, they took what they needed anyway. They often paid with Confederate States dollars or with drafts on the Confederate government. The Confederate cavalry commander J.E.B. Stuart also reported the alleged KGC tickets when documenting the campaign.

That same year, Asbury Harpending and California members of the Knights of the Golden Circle in San Francisco outfitted the schooner J. M. Chapman as a Confederate privateer in San Francisco Bay, with the object of raiding commerce on the Pacific Coast and capturing gold shipments to the East Coast. Their attempt was detected and they were seized on the night of their intended departure.

In late 1863, the KGC reorganized as the Order of American Knights.  In 1864, it became the Order of the Sons of Liberty, with the Ohio politician Clement L. Vallandigham, most prominent of the Copperheads, as its supreme commander. In most areas only a minority of its membership was radical enough to discourage enlistments, resist the draft, and shield deserters. The KGC held numerous peace meetings. A few agitators, some of them encouraged by Southern money, talked of a revolt in the Old Northwest, with the goal of ending the war.

Survival conspiracy theory

The Los Angeles Times noted that one theory, among many, on the origin of the Saddle Ridge Hoard of gold coins is that it was cached by the KGC, which "some believe buried millions in ill-gotten gold across a dozen states to finance a second Civil War".

Alleged members 

 George W. L. Bickley
 John Wilkes Booth
 Confederados (some)
 Jefferson Davis
 Nathan Bedford Forrest
 Jesse James

 Thomas Lubbock
 Lambdin P. Milligan
 Buckner Stith Morris
 Samuel Mudd
 John Surratt

In popular culture
 In November 1950, the anthology radio drama Destination Freedom recapped the early history of the Knights in an episode entitled "The Golden Circle". 
 The alternate history novel Bring the Jubilee (1958) by Ward Moore and the similarly themed movie C.S.A.: The Confederate States of America explore the results of a Southern victory in the Civil War. Both works posit the Golden Circle as a plan enacted after the war. Both also have the Confederacy take over all of South America rather than the northern portion of the continent.  However, in the former, the Confederacy annexes both Hawaii and Alaska, and in the latter the Confederacy also annexes all of the continental United States.
 In the Southern Victory Series by Harry Turtledove, the Confederacy's post-war territorial expansion into Latin America amounts only to the purchase of Cuba from Spain and the purchase of Sonora and Chihuahua from the Mexican Empire for the purposes of constructing a transcontinental railway and establishing a Confederate naval presence in the Pacific. Following the Confederacy's defeat in the Second Great War, Cuba, Sonora and Chihuahua along with the rest of the CSA are annexed to the United States.
 The Night of the Iron Tyrants (1990–1991), written by the novelist Mark Ellis and drawn by Darryl Banks, is a four-part comic book miniseries based on The Wild Wild West television series. It features the Knights of the Golden Circle in an assassination plot against President Ulysses S. Grant and Dom Pedro II of Brazil during the Philadelphia Centennial Exposition of 1876.
 The KGC are the villains of the graphic novel Batman: Detective No. 27 (2003) by Michael Uslan and Peter Snejbjerg.
 The KGC are portrayed as conspirators in the Lincoln assassination in the Disney movie National Treasure: Book of Secrets (2007).
 In the William Martin novel The Lincoln Letter (2012), the KGC are a group of conspirators in Washington, DC, during the Civil War.
 The KGC and their potential involvement in President Lincoln's assassination are discussed in an episode of the History Channel series America Unearthed.
 The KGC are the antagonists in a story which is featured in the Atomic Robo web comic.
 The KGC are referenced during a discussion concerning a potential assassination plot in the PBS television series Mercy Street.
 The KGC are the subject of a historical fiction novel by Steve Berry which is entitled The Lost Order, released April 4, 2017.

See also

 Adams-Onís Treaty
 All of Mexico Movement
 American imperialism
 American Mediterranean Sea
 Antebellum South
 Judah P. Benjamin
 Camp Douglas Conspiracy
 Confederados
 Confederate colonies
 Filibuster (military)
 Linconia
 Manifest Destiny
 Republic of Sonora
 Republic of Yucatán
 Second Mexican Empire
 Slave Power
 Slavery in the United States
 Walker affair

References
Notes

Bibliography
 
 
 
 
  (currently published under the title of Rebel Gold )
 
 
 
 
 
 
 

Further reading
 
  An Authentic Exposition of the “K.G.C.” “Knights of the Golden Circle,” or, A History of Secession from 1834 to 1861, by A Member of the Order (Indianapolis, Indiana: C. O. Perrine, Publisher, 1861).
 Donald S. Frazier, Blood & Treasure: Confederate Empire in the Southwest (College Station: Texas A&M University Press, 1996).
 Warren Getler and Bob Brewer, Rebel Gold: One Man’s Quest to Crack the Code Behind the Secret Treasure of the Confederacy (New York: Simon & Schuster, 2004).
 Dion Haco, ed., The Private Journal and Diary of John H. Surratt, The Conspirator (New York: Frederic A. Brady, Publisher, 1866).
 James D. Horan, Confederate Agent: A Discovery in History (New York: Crown Publishers, Inc., 1954).
 Jesse Lee James, Jesse James and the Lost Cause (New York: Pageant Press, 1961).
 Jack Myers, Knights' Gold (CreateSpace Independent Publishing, 2016).

External links
 Sons of Liberty (American Civil War) – Ohio History Central
  Joseph Holt, Report of the Judge Advocate General on “The Order of American Knights,” alias "The Sons of Liberty." A Western Conspiracy in aid of the Southern Rebellion (Washington, D.C.: Union Congressional Committee, 1864).

1854 establishments in Ohio
1860 in Central America
1860s in Central America
1860s in politics
1860s in the Caribbean
19th century in Central America
19th century in the Caribbean
American Civil War political groups
American proslavery activists
Bleeding Kansas
California in the American Civil War
Expansion of slavery in the United States
History of United States expansionism
Indiana in the American Civil War
James–Younger Gang
 
Ohio in the American Civil War
Pennsylvania in the American Civil War
Political history of the United States
Proposed countries
Proposed states and territories of the United States
Secret societies in the United States
Slavery in the United States
Texas in the American Civil War
1863 disestablishments in Ohio